The pterygoid plexus (from Greek pteryx, "wing" and eidos, "shape") is a venous plexus of considerable size, and is situated between the temporalis muscle and lateral pterygoid muscle, and partly between the two pterygoid muscles.

Tributaries received
It receives tributaries corresponding with the branches of the maxillary artery.

Thus it receives the following veins:
 sphenopalatine
 middle meningeal 
 deep temporal (anterior & posterior)
 pterygoid
 masseteric
 buccinator
 alveolar
 some palatine veins (palatine vein which divides into the greater and lesser palatine v.)
 a branch which communicates with the ophthalmic vein through the inferior orbital fissure
 infraorbital vein

Relations
This plexus communicates freely with the anterior facial vein; it also communicates with the cavernous sinus, by branches through the foramen Vesalii, foramen ovale, and foramen lacerum.  Due to its communication with the cavernous sinus, infection of the superficial face may spread to the cavernous sinus, causing cavernous sinus thrombosis.  Complications may include edema of the eyelids, conjunctivae of the eyes, and subsequent paralysis of cranial nerves which course through the cavernous sinus.

The pterygoid plexus of veins becomes the maxillary vein.  The maxillary vein and the superficial temporal vein later join to become the retromandibular vein.  The posterior branch of the retromandibular vein and posterior auricular vein then form the external jugular vein, which empties into the subclavian vein.

References

External links
  - "Infratemporal Fossa: The Pterygoid Plexus of Veins"
 Pterygoid Plexus

Veins of the head and neck